Mansoor Ahmad Mir is an Indian Judge and the former Chief Justice of Himachal Pradesh High Court.

Career 
Mir was born on 25 April 1955, at Rajpora village of Pulwama district in Jammu and Kashmir. He obtained a bachelor's degree (BA) from Amar Singh College in 1976 and LL.B in 1978 from Kashmir University. After practicing law for 14 years, he appeared for Jammu and Kashmir Judicial Services Examination and secured the first position in 1992. Mir was appointed Additional Judge of the Jammu and Kashmir High Court on 31 January 2005 and later its permanent judge on 7 July 2007. He was transferred to the High Court of Himachal Pradesh (HP) and took over as Acting Chief Justice on 26 November 2013, and remained on the position up to 18 June 2014, when he was appointed Chief Justice of Himachal Pradesh.

References 

Living people
20th-century Indian judges
1955 births
Judges of the Jammu and Kashmir High Court
Chief Justices of the Himachal Pradesh High Court